The Men's 4 x 400 metres relay race at the 2011 European Athletics Indoor Championships was held at March 6, 2011 at 17:40 local time.

Records

Results

The final was held at 17:40.

References

4 × 400 metres relay at the European Athletics Indoor Championships
2011 European Athletics Indoor Championships